ARSA or Arsa may refer to:
 Arylsulfatase A, gene for a human protein
 All-Russian Scout Association
 Arakan Rohingya Salvation Army, insurgent group in Rakhine State, Myanmar (Burma)
 Arsa, a settlement in Albești, Constanța, Romania
 Arsenije Milošević "Arsa" (1931–2006), Yugoslav Serbian film and television director
 Associate of the Royal Scottish Academy
 Automated Radioxenon Sampler Analyzer

See also 
 Arsha (community development block) in India